The decade of the 1870s in film involved some significant events.

Events
1874 – French astronomer Pierre Janssen used his "photographic revolver" to photograph the transit of the planet Venus across the Sun. 
1877 – French inventor Charles-Émile Reynaud improved on the Zoetrope idea by placing mirrors at the center of the drum. He called his invention the Praxinoscope. Reynaud developed other versions of the Praxinoscope, too, including a Praxinoscope Theatre (where the device was enclosed in a viewing box) and the Projecting Praxinoscope. Eventually he created the "Théâtre Optique", a large machine based on the Praxinoscope, but was able to project longer animated strips. In the United States, the McLoughlin Bros. from New York released in 1879 a simplified (and unauthorized) copy of Reynaud's invention under the name "Whirligig of Life".
1877–1878: Thomas Edison's announcement of his phonograph invention inspired Scientific American to suggest combinations with stereoscopic photographs and projection. Wordsworth Donisthorpe replied that his Kinesigraph (patented in 1876) would soon produce moving life size-photographs with the motion of lips and gestures corresponding to the words from the phonograph.
1878 – Eadweard Muybridge records his famous chronophotographic series of pictures of the phases of The Horse in Motion, the result of an assignment by Railroad tycoon Leland Stanford  who wanted to see proof of the real positions of the horse's gait. The pictures had a huge impact, because the recorded positions were very different (and often less gracious) than most people imagined; many drawings and paintings turned out to be incorrect.

Births

See also
 Film
 History of film
 Lists of films
 1870s in music

 
Films by decade
Film by decade